Awam is an Urdu language daily newspaper based in Karachi, Pakistan. This newspaper was started in 1994. It is an evening daily newspaper published by Jang Group of Newspapers. The Sindhi version of Awam is the most circulated newspaper in interior Sindh.

See also 
 List of newspapers in Pakistan

References

External links
 

1994 establishments in Pakistan
Mass media in Karachi
Daily newspapers published in Pakistan
Publications established in 1994
Urdu-language newspapers published in Pakistan